The Green Council (GC) is a non-profit, non-partisan environmental association of Hong Kong formed by a group of individuals from different sectors of industry and academics who shared a vision to turn Hong Kong into a world-class green city for the future.

History
Green council (GC) (Cantonese: 環保促進會) was formed in May 2000, and was registered as a non-profit making organization in December of the same year. The council is a non-partisan environmental organization that was formed by individuals from different backgrounds who wished to promote environmental education to the general public and to support environmental protection in production as well as management processes in both industrial and commercial sectors.

The council aims to improve knowledge of environmental issues for industry, retailers, suppliers, governments, academics and the general public, in order to derive a change in attitudes, perspectives, decision making and actions. To achieve this, the council intends to provide environmental education and complementary training programs, to: promote green products and service selection and purchasing; encourage environmental and sustainable management ideas and practices; discourage the disposable culture by supporting recycling and re-using materials; encourage energy conservation and further promote renewable energy resources; and promote sustainable research and development, manufacture and consumption.

The Green Label Scheme

The Hong Kong Green Label Scheme (HKGLS) is an independent, non-profit-making and voluntary scheme which sets environmental standards and presents the certification of environmentally preferable products launched in December 2000 by Green Council (GC) in regards with the increased demand for environmental friendly products.

Under the scheme, the GC has established the authoritative, self-governing green (eco-) label scheme to qualify products that are environmentally preferable to consumers. HKGLS benchmarked from different eco-labels that adopted life cycle analysis (LCA) in their criteria development and is an ISO (International Organization for Standardization) 14024 that involves a third-party official recognition requiring considerations of life cycle impacts.

For the Green (eco-) label scheme, the HKGLS employs a product information database to identify and select the appropriate product categories. A concerned product category must not cause threats to human beings or environmental quality and cannot be fully replaced by other environmentally benign alternative; in addition, the concerned product category must be commonly used in Hong Kong. While, some criteria contained in these standards require compliance with legislation and the Hong Kong SAR Government's energy efficiency label scheme, an Advisory Committee is established with members drew from GC, HKPC, academia, industrial, commercial and environmental sectors to help administrate the policy and functions of the HKGLS.

The Advisory Committee has four main functions, which are to advice on operational guidelines including product categories and respective product environmental criteria, to oversee the HKGLS application and assessment systems, to approve or disapprove of HKGLS applications and to license or withdraw the use of the HKGLS labels. Whereas, the industrial sector plays a major part in the success of HKGLS’s implementation, some applicable industrial organizations have been invited to provide suggestions on the establishment of product categories, application procedures and assessment systems, also to promote the HLGLS to local industry associations.

Education
Using the motto "conservation begins with education", Green Council treats the promotion of public environmental education as one of its main objectives.

Green Carnival 2010

On January 31, 2010, the EPSON Green Carnival 2010 was held on the Hong Kong Polytechnic University Podium. There were more than 4,000 participants in this public environmental education event.

This year, the event is co-organized by the Department of Applied Biology and Chemical Technology of the Hong Kong Polytechnic University and supported by the Environmental Protection Department, Electrical and Mechanical Services Department and The Hong Kong Institution of Engineers Young Members Committee.

Over fifty organizations including governmental departments, academic institutions, professional associations, private organizations and green groups had participated and supported the Carnival.

Base on the theme “Combat against Global Warming”, the Carnival aims to promote environmental protection in daily practice in hopes of raising public awareness on the issue of global warming. Twenty-four government departments, schools, professional associations, private companies and green groups displayed 30 environmental education fun-filled game booths.

Ninth Creative Eco-model Tournament was another attraction of the Carnival. There were 62 teams, representing 14 primary schools and 14 secondary schools, using recycled materials, rubber band, propellers and their ideas to design and build a hovercraft, so as to compete the awards. The awards include the speed and design and overall championship. The winner was Chi Lin Buddhist Secondary School this year.

International Coastal Cleanup

The international Coastal Cleanup (ICC) is an event that lets the public to remove trash and debris from beaches and waterways, and also record the types of debris found. It was found by The Ocean Conservancy in 1986. The data are then complied and analyse by The Ocean Conservancy to identify the major sources of debris and also activities that contribute to it. The main aim is to let the public to understand the problem and find out a long-lasting solution. It is an important event as it serves as an opportunity to teach students and the public about social and environmental responsibilities.

Hong Kong ICC 2009 started from 19 September to 13 November, a total of 2,596 volunteers participated in the event. 7086.01 kg of debris at 65 separate clean-ups at 43 sites (including 32 of which were held in gazetted beaches managed by the Leisure and Cultural Services Department). Broken glass, Styrofoam plastic boxes and plastic bags were the first three most collected items this year. Most of the debris were made from irresponsible shoreline and recreational activities.

The data shows that coastal and marine pollution originates from shoreline activities and is a local problem. Many companies and factories and also individuals are unawareness of the problem. More education are needed.

News and events

Becoming the sole HKG representative for China Environmental Label application 

On September 11, 2006, a joint venture signing ceremony on an important agreement officially designating the Green Council as the sole Hong Kong representative office for offering and awarding the China Environmental Label outside of China was held in Beijing. The agreement was signed by officials from the Green Council of Hong Kong, the China Environmental United (Beijing) Certification Center Co., Ltd (CEC) and Environmental Certification Center of the State Environmental Protection Administration of China (SEPA).

The purpose of the agreement between the Green Council and the CEC is to promote and enhance ecolabelling, sustainable procurement and consumption in China. Due to language and cultural differences, there has been limited recognition about and access to the China Environmental Label. Now, the Green Council has become the representative office in Hong Kong responsible for handling inquiries and applications for the China Environmental Label from companies in Hong Kong, Macau, Taipei and other overseas countries.

Green Label Series: Green Construction Material Seminar I - Impacts of Paint on Indoor Air Quality

The Green Council and Hong Kong Productivity Council had jointly organized a green construction material seminar in the late 2002 to address the impacts of paint on indoor air quality. Innovative paint products and green technologies were introduced to participants like property developers and consumers. Furthermore, speakers also made use of the chance to introduce details of green label certification schemes in Hong Kong and China.

Experts and specialists on environmental science and chemistry were invited to present at the seminar. Mr Raymond Fong, Principal Consultant of Environmental Management Division from Hong Kong Productivity Council, introduced the impacts of paints towards indoor air quality. Volatile organic compounds (VOCs) emitted during the application of paint might cause eye irritations, headaches, dizziness and skin allergy etc. Continued inhalation may even cause damage to central nervous system. Therefore, ingredients of paint should be labeled clearly. It is also recommended to use water-based paint which has a lower percentage of VOCs.

References

External links
 Green Council website
 Green Hong Kong Campaign
 Green Education and Resource Centre
 Green Label Scheme
 International Coastal Cleanup 2009 Hong Kong

Environmental organisations based in Hong Kong
Environmental organizations established in 2000